The Shanni Nationalities Army (abbr. SNA) is a Shanni insurgent group active in northern Sagaing Region and Kachin State, Myanmar (Burma). It was founded as a group in 1989 but was transformed into an armed group in January 2016 by expelled Shanni members of the Kachin Independence Army. The SNA has five objectives – to gain statehood, to fight drugs, to establish a federal Union, to build unity among all Shan sub-groups, and to conserve ecological balance.

Background 
The Tai Lai or Shanni people, who number around 300,000 people total, are a related people to the Shan people. They live in western Kachin State and northern Sagaing Region. The Shanni people suffered identity suppression with many in the SNA pointing to the history of losing their territory to the Kachin people following the Panglong Agreement Some in the SNA claim the history of historic Shan states in the area from Mong Yang to Hkamti Long. The overlap between desires for a Shanni state and the existing Kachin state puts the group in conflict with the Kachin Independence Army,

History

Formation to 2020 
According to the Shanni Nationalities Army (SNA), the group was formed in July 1989 and first established a headquarters in Nwe Impha on the India–Myanmar border in 2009.

The formation of the SNA was announced in January 2016 on the basis that by establishing an armed group, the Shanni people would be given a more prominent role in the country's political dialogue and would be able to protect their area. The SNA grew into relevance from the aftermath of the Nationwide Ceasefire Agreement and against the backdrop of increased violence between the Kachin Independence Army and the Shan State Army – South. SNA members took up arms as they felt only by having an armed group would their ethnic group be an important consideration in the peace process. The SNA and Shanni activists in 2016 wanted the National League for Democracy to allow them to sign the NCA. However, the government had a policy not to recognize new ethnic armed groups.

By 2019, they had bases in several parts of Kachin State and Sagaing Region. Tensions between the Myanmar Army and the SNA increased in mid-April 2020 with increased Myanmar Army militarization in Homalin Township eventually suppressing continued armed conflict In July 2020, five KIA fighters killed two teenage Shanni boys after taking them captive. The KIA issued a formal apology and punished the fighters two weeks later after increased tension and pressure from the SNA.

2021–2022 Myanmar civil war

The Shanni Nationalities Army (SNA) typically welcomed the presence of the Tatmadaw in their own areas to stand against the Kachin Independence Army (KIA). Many leaders within the SNA preferred to remain bystanders maintaining good connections with the Myanmar Army even as the 2021 Myanmar coup d'état devolved into renewed ethnic conflict. On 26 May 2021, the second-in-command of the SNA, Major General Sao Khun Kyaw was assassinated by the Myanmar Army.

However, by 2022, the SNA was actively allied with the junta as conflict between SNA and the KIA grew. In August, the SNA and the Myanmar Army set fire to hundreds of homes in Kachin state forcing KIA withdrawal from the area. In September, two SNA bases were attacked by the KIA and allied People's Defence Force groups using heavy artillery in Banmauk Township and Homalin Township.

References

External links
 SNA's Facebook page

Paramilitary organisations based in Myanmar
Rebel groups in Myanmar
Separatism in Myanmar